Dolow District is a district in the southwestern Gedo region of Somalia. Its capital is Dolow. Dolow Somalia is bordered west by Dolow Ado district  of Ethiopia. Between the two district river dawa halves.

Administration System

The administrative system in dolow town is basically under the Gedo region authority and Somali Nation Armay control as most of the central government offices are yet to be fully opened in Gedo region but obey direct order from the Government representatives.

References

External links
 Districts of Somalia
 Administrative map of Dolow District

Districts of Somalia

Gedo